The Waterloo Medal of the Duchy of Nassau was established by Frederick Augustus, Duke of Nassau on 23 December 1815.

Other Waterloo Medals
Five nations of Seventh Coalition struck medals for soldiers who took part in the campaign:
 This medal for the officers and men of Nassau
 Waterloo Medal for British and King's German Legion troops
 Brunswick Waterloo Medal
 Hanoverian Waterloo Medal
 Prussian Waterloo Medal

Notes

References

House of Nassau
Orders, decorations, and medals of the German Empire
1815 establishments in the Duchy of Nassau
Awards established in 1815
Battle of Waterloo